The Russian National Road Race Championships are cycling races that are held annually to determine the Russian cycling champion in road racing, across several categories of riders. The event was first held in 1992 and was won by Asiat Saitov. Sergei Ivanov holds the men's record of most victories with six.

Multiple winners

Men

Elite

U23

Women

References

External links 

National road cycling championships
Cycle races in Russia
Recurring events established in 1992
National championships in Russia